In mathematics, the Stieltjes polynomials En are polynomials associated to a family of orthogonal polynomials Pn. They are unrelated to the Stieltjes polynomial solutions of differential equations. Stieltjes originally considered the case where the orthogonal polynomials Pn are  the Legendre polynomials. 

The Gauss–Kronrod quadrature formula  uses the zeros of Stieltjes polynomials.

Definition

If P0, P1, form a sequence of orthogonal polynomials for some inner product, then the Stieltjes polynomial En is a degree n polynomial orthogonal to Pn–1(x)xk for k = 0, 1, ..., n – 1.

References

Orthogonal polynomials